Henri-Lambert d'Herbigny, marquis de Thibouville (1710 in Paris – 1784) was a notable French writer, wit and bisexual.

Life

Career
Born to a conseiller d'État, he at first followed a military career, rising to the rank of mestre de camp in the régiment des dragons de la Reine. He then left the army for a literary career and linked himself to Voltaire, via an assiduous correspondence (more than 50 letters by Voltaire to Thibouville survive). His taste for the theatre and declamation allowed him to act as intermediary between Voltaire and actors putting on his plays, and sometimes between Voltaire and his editors.

Sexuality
In 1731, Thibouville had married Louise-Élisabeth de Rochechouart, taking a female mistress, Mélanie de Laballe (who had débuted at the Comédie Française in 1746, in the rôle of Agnès in École des femmes and died of smallpox in 1748 aged only 16). This gave rise to the epigram

Melchior Grimm described Thibouville, probably around 1759, as "even more attached than M. de Villette to the cult of love which our sages rudely proscribe, but which those of ancient Greece excused with such indulgence", referring to his notorious bisexuality. Voltaire himself, in the first editions of La Pucelle d'Orléans, mentioned him alongside Honoré-Armand de Villars in the following verses:

In a letter of 21 May 1755, to Thibouville Voltaire denied being the real author of those lines - "My poor Pucelle has become an infamous p..., accused of insupportable vulgarities. It is still mixed up with satire; for their commodity of rhyme, scandalous verses have been slipped into it against the people to whom I am most attached." However, Voltaire was accustomed to making these disingenuous denials and the veracity of this one is questionable.

Works
Thibouville's reputation rests more on his wit than his talent and his literary works have received little critical acclaim. The surviving ones include:
Thélamine, tragedy, 1739 ;
L'École de l'Amitié, novel, 1757 ;
Le Danger des passions, ou anectodotes syriennes et égyptiennes, 1758 ;
Réponses d'Abeilard à Héloïse, 1758 ;
Namir, tragedy, 1759;
Qui ne risque rien n'a rien, 1772 ;
Plus heureux, 1772.

Notes 

1710 births
1784 deaths
French gay writers
LGBT nobility
18th-century French novelists
18th-century French dramatists and playwrights
18th-century LGBT people
Writers from Paris
French LGBT novelists
French LGBT dramatists and playwrights
French male dramatists and playwrights
French male novelists
18th-century French male writers